Quercus texana, commonly known as Nuttall's oak, is a fast-growing, large deciduous oak tree.

It is a tree growing up to 25 meters (83 feet) tall, with dark brown bark. It has leaves with sharp pointed lobes somewhat similar to those of the Georgia oak (Q. georgiana) and pin oak (Q. palustris). It is fast-growing and usually has a pleasing red color in autumn, much more reliably so than the pin oak.

This species was for years erroneously called Quercus nuttallii, but it is now known as Q. texana; this has created much confusion with Texas red oak, which was known as Q. texana but is now known as Q. buckleyi.

It is native to the south-central United States primarily in the lower Mississippi River Valley in Louisiana, Arkansas, Mississippi, Alabama, and western Tennessee.  There are additional populations in eastern Texas, southeastern Oklahoma, southeastern Missouri, far western Kentucky, and the southernmost tip of Illinois.

It is still relatively obscure in the horticultural industry but is slowly gaining popularity due to its fast growth rate, ease of transplanting, good fall colors and ability to grow in wet soils. It is known for its ability to rapidly recover its gas exchange after flooding.

References

External links
 Nuttall's Oak in the Biosurvey of Oklahoma
 photo of herbarium specimen at Missouri Botanical Garden, collected in Missouri in 1989

texana
Trees of the Southeastern United States
Endemic flora of the United States
Flora of Texas
Plants described in 1860